The Right Touch is  the tenth album by American pianist and arranger Duke Pearson featuring performances recorded in 1967 and released on the Blue Note label in 1968.

Reception
The Allmusic review by Scott Yanow awarded the album 5 stars calling it "one of the finest recordings of Duke Pearson's career".

Track listing
All compositions by Duke Pearson.

 "Chili Peppers" - 6:52
 "Make It Good" - 6:41
 "My Love Waits (O Meu Amor Espera)" - 5:56
 "Los Malos Hombres" - 6:34
 "Scrap Iron" - 5:23
 "Rotary" - 6:18
 "Los Malos Hombres" [Alternate Take] - 5:02 Bonus track on CD reissue and digital media releases

Personnel
Duke Pearson - piano
Freddie Hubbard - trumpet, flugelhorn track 3
Garnett Brown - trombone
Jerry Dodgion - alto saxophone, flute
James Spaulding - alto saxophone
Stanley Turrentine - tenor saxophone
Gene Taylor - bass
Grady Tate - drums

References

Blue Note Records albums
Duke Pearson albums
1968 albums
Albums recorded at Van Gelder Studio